The Public Authority for Special Economic Zones and Free Zones (OPAZ) is a governmental body in the Sultanate of Oman. The Royal Decree No 105/2020 established OPAZ in August 2020.

The headquarter of OPAZ is located in Muscat.

References 

Economy of Oman
Special economic zones